Innovation Saskatchewan is an arms length agency of the Government of Saskatchewan in Canada.  The agency is responsible for assessing and advising government on science and technology;

See also

Saskatchewan Research Council

References

Saskatchewan government ministries and agencies
Research institutes in Canada